Xieyang Island is a Chinese island in the Gulf of Tonkin, located  southeast of Weizhou Island. Administratively, it, along with Weizhou Island, forms the town of Weizhou, in Haicheng District, Beihai, Guangxi.

It has an area of only  and is of volcanic origin. The island may be described as appearing like a goat with its front legs crouched, and so in ancient times was also called "".

It is one of the tourist attractions of Beihai.

Along with Weizhou Island, waters around Xieyang Island was discovered in 2015 to be seasonally frequented by Bryde's whales, and the area has become the first acknowledged location among mainland coasts of China to have regular migrations of large cetaceans.

References

斜阳岛---中国著名岛屿介绍_中国景点网

Islands of Guangxi
Islands of the South China Sea
Volcanic islands
Gulf of Tonkin